In computability theory, the Ackermann function, named after Wilhelm Ackermann, is one of the simplest and earliest-discovered examples of a total computable function that is not primitive recursive. All primitive recursive functions are total and computable, but the Ackermann function illustrates that not all total computable functions are primitive recursive. After Ackermann's publication of his function (which had three non-negative integer arguments), many authors modified it to suit various purposes, so that today "the Ackermann function" may refer to any of numerous variants of the original function. One common version, the two-argument Ackermann–Péter function is defined as follows for nonnegative integers m and n:

Its value grows rapidly, even for small inputs. For example,  is an integer of 19,729 decimal digits (equivalent to 265536−3, or 22222−3).

History
In the late 1920s, the mathematicians Gabriel Sudan and Wilhelm Ackermann, students of David Hilbert, were studying the foundations of computation. Both Sudan and Ackermann are credited with discovering total computable functions (termed simply "recursive" in some references) that are not primitive recursive. Sudan published the lesser-known Sudan function, then shortly afterwards and independently, in 1928, Ackermann published his function  (the Greek letter phi).

and for p > 2 it extends these basic operations in a way that can be compared to the hyperoperations:

(Aside from its historic role as a total-computable-but-not-primitive-recursive function, Ackermann's original function is seen to extend the basic arithmetic operations beyond exponentiation, although not as seamlessly as do variants of Ackermann's function that are specifically designed for that purpose—such as Goodstein's hyperoperation sequence.)

In On the Infinite, David Hilbert hypothesized that the Ackermann function was not primitive recursive, but it was Ackermann, Hilbert's personal secretary and former student, who actually proved the hypothesis in his paper On Hilbert's Construction of the Real Numbers.

Rózsa Péter and Raphael Robinson later developed a two-variable version of the Ackermann function that became preferred by almost all authors.

The generalized hyperoperation sequence, e.g. , is a version of Ackermann function as well.

In 1963 R.C. Buck based an intuitive two-variable  variant  on the hyperoperation sequence:

Compared to most other versions Buck's function has no unessential offsets:

Many other versions of Ackermann function have been investigated.

Definition

Definition: as m-ary function 
Ackermann's original three-argument function  is defined recursively as follows for nonnegative integers  and :

The Ackermann function has also been expressed in relation to the hyperoperation sequence:

or, written in Knuth's up-arrow notation (extended to integer indices ):

or, equivalently, in terms of Buck's function F:

Definition: as iterated 1-ary function 
Define  as the n-th iterate of :

Iteration is the process of composing a function with itself a certain number of times. Function composition is an associative operation, so .

Conceiving the Ackermann function as a sequence of unary functions, one can set .

The function then becomes a sequence  of unary functions, defined from iteration:

Computation
The recursive definition of the Ackermann function can naturally be transposed to a term rewriting system (TRS).

TRS, based on 2-ary function
The definition of the 2-ary Ackermann function leads to the obvious reduction rules 

Example

Compute 

The reduction sequence is 

To compute  one can use a stack, which initially contains the elements .

Then repeatedly the two top elements are replaced according to the rules

Schematically, starting from :

 WHILE stackLength <> 1
 {
    POP 2 elements;
    PUSH 1 or 2 or 3 elements, applying the rules r1, r2, r3
 }

For example, on input ,

Remarks
The leftmost-innermost strategy is implemented in 225 computer languages on Rosetta Code.
For all  the computation of  takes no more than  steps.
Their own algorithm, inherently iterative, computes  within  time and within  space.

TRS, based on iterated 1-ary function
The definition of the iterated 1-ary Ackermann functions leads to different reduction rules

As function composition is associative, instead of rule r6 one can define

Like in the previous section the computation of  can be implemented with a stack.

Initially the stack contains the three elements .

Then repeatedly the three top elements are replaced according to the rules

Schematically, starting from :
 WHILE stackLength <> 1
 {
    POP 3 elements;
    PUSH 1 or 3 or 5 elements, applying the rules r4, r5, r6;
 }

Example

On input  the successive stack configurations are

The corresponding equalities are

When reduction rule r7 is used instead of rule r6, the replacements in the stack will follow

The successive stack configurations will then be

The corresponding equalities are 

Remarks
On any given input the TRSs presented so far converge in the same number of steps. They also use the same reduction rules (in this comparison the rules r1, r2, r3 are considered "the same as" the rules r4, r5, r6/r7 respectively). For example, the reduction of  converges in 14 steps: 6 × r1, 3 × r2, 5 × r3. The reduction of  converges in the same 14 steps: 6 × r4, 3 × r5, 5 × r6/r7. The TRSs differ in the order in which the reduction rules are applied.
When  is computed following the rules {r4, r5, r6}, the maximum length of the stack stays below . When reduction rule r7 is used instead of rule r6, the maximum length of the stack is only . The length of the stack reflects the recursion depth. As the reduction according to the rules {r4, r5, r7} involves a smaller maximum depth of recursion, this computation is more efficient in that respect.

TRS, based on hyperoperators
As  — or  — showed explicitly, the Ackermann function can be expressed in terms of the hyperoperation sequence:

or, after removal of the constant 2 from the parameter list, in terms of Buck's function
  

Buck's function , a variant of Ackermann function by itself, can be computed with the following reduction rules:

Instead of rule b6 one can define the rule 

To compute the Ackermann function it suffices to add three reduction rules

These rules take care of the base case A(0,n), the alignment (n+3) and the fudge (-3).

Example

Compute 

The matching equalities are
when the TRS with the reduction rule  is applied:

when the TRS with the reduction rule  is applied:

Remarks
The computation of  according to the rules {b1 - b5, b6, r8 - r10} is deeply recursive. The culprit is the order in which iteration is executed: . The first  disappears only after the whole sequence is unfolded.
The computation according to the rules {b1 - b5, b7, r8 - r10} is more efficient in that respect. The iteration  simulates the repeated loop over a block of code.
These considerations concern the recursion depth only. Either way of iterating leads to the same number of reduction steps, involving the same rules (when the rules b6 and b7 are considered "the same"). The modus iterandi only affects the order in which the reduction rules are applied.
A real gain of execution time can only be achieved by not recalculating subresults over and over again. Memoization is an optimization technique where the results of function calls are cached and returned when the same inputs occur again. See for instance .  published a cunning algorithm which computes  within  time and within  space.

Huge numbers
To demonstrate how the computation of  results in many steps and in a large number:

Table of values 
Computing the Ackermann function can be restated in terms of an infinite table. First, place the natural numbers along the top row. To determine a number in the table, take the number immediately to the left. Then use that number to look up the required number in the column given by that number and one row up. If there is no number to its left, simply look at the column headed "1" in the previous row. Here is a small upper-left portion of the table:

The numbers here which are only expressed with recursive exponentiation or Knuth arrows are very large and would take up too much space to notate in plain decimal digits.

Despite the large values occurring in this early section of the table, some even larger numbers have been defined, such as Graham's number, which cannot be written with any small number of Knuth arrows. This number is constructed with a technique similar to applying the Ackermann function to itself recursively.

This is a repeat of the above table, but with the values replaced by the relevant expression from the function definition to show the pattern clearly:

Properties

General remarks 
It may not be immediately obvious that the evaluation of  always terminates. However, the recursion is bounded because in each recursive application either  decreases, or  remains the same and  decreases. Each time that  reaches zero,  decreases, so  eventually reaches zero as well. (Expressed more technically, in each case the pair  decreases in the lexicographic order on pairs, which is a well-ordering, just like the ordering of single non-negative integers; this means one cannot go down in the ordering infinitely many times in succession.) However, when  decreases there is no upper bound on how much  can increase — and it will often increase greatly.
For small values of m like 1, 2, or 3, the Ackermann function grows relatively slowly with respect to n (at most exponentially).
An interesting aspect is that the only arithmetic operation it ever uses is addition of 1. Its fast growing power is based solely on nested recursion. This also implies that its running time is at least proportional to its output, and so is also extremely huge. In actuality, for most cases the running time is far larger than the output; see above.
This extreme growth can be exploited to show that  which is obviously computable on a machine with infinite memory such as a Turing machine and so is a computable function, grows faster than any primitive recursive function and is therefore not primitive recursive.

Not primitive recursive 

The Ackermann function grows faster than any primitive recursive function and therefore is not itself primitive recursive.

Specifically, one shows that to every primitive recursive function  there exists a non-negative integer  such that for all non-negative integers ,

Once this is established, it follows that  itself is not primitive recursive, since otherwise putting  would lead to the contradiction 

The proof proceeds as follows: define the class  of all functions that grow slower than the Ackermann function

and show that  contains all primitive recursive functions. The latter is achieved by showing that  contains the constant functions, the successor function, the projection functions and that it is closed under the operations of function composition and primitive recursion.

Inverse 
Since the function  considered above grows very rapidly, its inverse function, f, grows very slowly. This inverse Ackermann function f−1 is usually denoted by α.

This inverse appears in the time complexity of some algorithms, such as the disjoint-set data structure and Chazelle's algorithm for minimum spanning trees. Sometimes Ackermann's original function or other variations are used in these settings, but they all grow at similarly high rates. In particular, some modified functions simplify the expression by eliminating the −3 and similar terms.

A two-parameter variation of the inverse Ackermann function can be defined as follows, where  is the floor function:

This function arises in more precise analyses of the algorithms mentioned above, and gives a more refined time bound. In the disjoint-set data structure, m represents the number of operations while n represents the number of elements; in the minimum spanning tree algorithm, m represents the number of edges while n represents the number of vertices. Several slightly different definitions of  exist; for example,  is sometimes replaced by n, and the floor function is sometimes replaced by a ceiling.

Other studies might define an inverse function of one where m is set to a constant, such that the inverse applies to a particular row. 

The inverse of the Ackermann function is primitive recursive.

Use as benchmark
The Ackermann function, due to its definition in terms of extremely deep recursion, can be used as a benchmark of a compiler's ability to optimize recursion. The first published use of Ackermann's function in this way was in 1970 by Dragoș Vaida and, almost simultaneously, in 1971, by Yngve Sundblad.

Sundblad's seminal paper was taken up by Brian Wichmann (co-author of the Whetstone benchmark) in a trilogy of papers written between 1975 and 1982.

See also

 Computability theory
 Double recursion
 Fast-growing hierarchy
 Goodstein function
 Primitive recursive function
 Recursion (computer science)

Notes

References

Bibliography

External links
 
 
 
 An animated Ackermann function calculator
 Ackerman function implemented using a for loop
 Scott Aaronson, Who can name the biggest number? (1999)
 Ackermann functions. Includes a table of some values.
 Hyper-operations: Ackermann's Function and New Arithmetical Operation
 Robert Munafo's Large Numbers describes several variations on the definition of A.
 Gabriel Nivasch, Inverse Ackermann without pain on the inverse Ackermann function.
 Raimund Seidel, Understanding the inverse Ackermann function (PDF presentation).
 The Ackermann function written in different programming languages, (on Rosetta Code)
 Ackermann's Function (Archived 2009-10-24)—Some study and programming by Harry J. Smith.

Arithmetic
Large integers
Special functions
Theory of computation
Computability theory